Louis II of Châtillon (died 26 August 1346), son of Guy I, Count of Blois and Margaret of Valois, was count of Blois and lord of Avesnes from 1342 to 1346.

Background and family
Louis was the eldest son of Guy I, Count of Blois and Margaret of Valois, the sister of King Philip VI of France. Born into the House of Châtillon, Louis was part of a prestigious military family with strong connections to the royal House of Valois and with great possessions in northeastern France centred around the county of Blois. His younger brother, Charles of Blois, was wed in 1337 to Joan of Penthièvre, the daughter and heiress of John III, Duke of Brittany, and invested as the duke's own successor.

In 1340 in Soissons, he married Jeanne of Avesnes, Countess of Soissons (d. 1350), daughter of John of Avesnes, Lord of Beaumont. They had three children:
 Louis III, Count of Blois and Soissons
 John II, Count of Blois
 Guy II, Count of Blois and Soissons

War with England
When the Duke of Brittany died in April 1341, Charles of Blois' claim on the duchy was contested by the old duke's half-brother John of Montfort, leading to the outbreak of the War of the Breton Succession. With the backing of their uncle Philip VI, Louis of Blois supported his brother's claim and served as one of his chief lieutenants, alongside Charles of Spain. On 15 April 1342, Louis joined his brother on a successful attack on Rennes, easily capturing the Montforts' easternmost stronghold.

Louis was killed at the battle of Crécy.

References

Sources

External links
 Counts of Blois

Chatillon, Louis I of
Louis II
Chatillon, Louis II of
Louis II
Year of birth unknown
People of the Hundred Years' War